Cerithium pacificum is a species of sea snail, a marine gastropod mollusk in the family Cerithiidae.

Description

Distribution
The distribution of Cerithium pacificum includes the Western Central Pacific.
 Philippines

References

Cerithiidae
Gastropods described in 1992